is a Japanese film director and writer.

Biography 
Born in Tokyo, the family then moved to Korea. In 1947, he moved back to Japan to work as an assistant director to Akira Kurosawa at the Toho studios. In 1958 he directed his first film, Hitogui Ama.

Personal life 
He was married to actress Mitsuya Utako from 1960 to her death in 2004.

Filmography 
 Hitogui Ama (1958)
 Onna Dorei-sen (1960)
 Onna Gankutsu-ō (1960)
Edo no Kaze (1975~1981) TV
Edo no Uzu (1978) TV
Edo no Gekitou (1979) TV
Onihei Hankachō TV
 Onihei's Detective Records (1995)
 Shigosen no Yume (2001)
 Kenkaku Shōbai: Haru no Arashi (2008), TV movie

References

External links 
 

Living people
1925 births
Japanese film directors
Japanese screenwriters
People from Tokyo
Samurai film directors